Felipe Augusto da Silva (born 18 February 2004), known as Felipe Augusto, is a Brazilian professional footballer who plays as a forward for Corinthians.

References

External links

2004 births
Living people
Footballers from São Paulo
Brazilian footballers
Association football forwards
Sport Club Corinthians Paulista players
Campeonato Brasileiro Série A players